Buck Simmonds is an American actor/guitarist. He starred in the 1992 film A River Runs Through It alongside Brad Pitt who he later lived with. Simmonds also starred in the 1998 film Scrapple.  Buck is an accomplished musician, nominated guitarist and mandolin player at the Los Angeles Music Awards (1999) and has recorded with numerous bands and musicians globally.

Buck played guitar for the bands Nectar, Hellbelly, Heapstack, and Grass.
Buck played mandolin for Tribal Folk.

Buck has also been credited with coining the phrase “Coulda open that winder, Lew Alcindor?

External links

Year of birth missing (living people)
Living people
American male film actors
American male guitarists